Riverside Municipal Airport (Riverside Arlington Airport, decades ago) , is four miles (6 km) southwest of downtown Riverside, the county seat of Riverside County, California, United States.

Scheduled flights to Laughlin/Bullhead International Airport (Arizona) on Western Express Air ended when that airline ceased operations at the end of May 2007.

Runway 9/27 was paved about 1956 and Bonanza Air Lines appeared soon after; until 1969 it and successor Air West flew DC-3s and Fairchild F-27s to LAX, Las Vegas, Palm Springs and beyond. Golden West Airlines served Riverside in the 1970s with nonstop and direct de Havilland Canada DHC-6 Twin Otters to LAX.

Riverside Municipal Airport has been home to Civil Air Patrol Squadron 5 since 2005.

"FedEx Express donated a Boeing 727-200F to California Baptist University for its new aviation science program. The aircraft will be on permanent display at the airport and will provide a working laboratory for aviation science students." The aircraft, N266FE (cn 21672/1538), is a Boeing 727-233/Adv(F).

Facilities

 9/27: 5,401 x 100 ft. (1,646 x 30 m), asphalt
 16/34: 2,850 x 48 ft. (869 x 15 m), asphalt
 H1: 60 x 60 ft. (18 x 18 m), asphalt

The runway has ILS, GPS, and VOR approaches.

Runway 27 has a Visual Approach Slope Indicator.

The crosswind runway, RWY 16-34, is suited for smaller aircraft. Runway 34 has a Precision Approach Path Indicator.

General aviation
The airport is home to about 100 general aviation aircraft.

FBOs:
Riverside Air Service
Airport businesses	
Capital Jet Management

References

External links 
Riverside Municipal Airport (official City of Riverside website)
Riverside Airshow
Civil Air Patrol, Senior Squadron 5
History of KRIV, KRAL & KRIR

Airports in Riverside County, California
Transportation in Riverside, California